Selenoscopus is a monotypic genus of stargazer from the family Uranoscopidae.

References

Uranoscopidae
Fish described in 1993